The Advertiser is a newspaper published in Bairnsdale, Victoria.

History 
The Advertiser was first published in 1877 and was known as the Bairnsdale Advertiser and Tambo and Omeo Chronicle for many years. It is currently published twice per week by East Gippsland Newspapers.

Digitisation 
The Advertiser has been digitised from 1882 to 1918 as part of the Australian Newspapers Digitisation Program of the National Library of Australia.

See also 
 List of newspapers in Australia

References

External links 
 
 East Gippsland Newspapers
 Digitised World War I Victorian newspapers from the State Library of Victoria

Newspapers published in Victoria (Australia)
Bairnsdale
Newspapers on Trove